Miss USA 1973 was the 22nd Miss USA pageant, televised live by CBS from Broadway Theatre, New York City, New York on May 19, 1973, Hosted by Bob Barker who 8 months earlier began hosting The Price Is Right on CBS.

The pageant was won by Amanda Jones of Illinois, who was crowned by outgoing titleholder Tanya Wilson of Hawaii.  Jones was the third woman from Illinois to win the Miss USA title, and went on to place as 1st runner-up to Margarita Moran of the Philippines at Miss Universe 1973.

Results

Special awards

Historical significance 
 Illinois wins competition for the third time. 
 New York earns the 1st runner-up position for the fourth time. The last time it placed this was in 1972. It reaches the same position as the previous year. 
 Rhode Island earns the 2nd runner-up position for the first time.
 Arizona earns the 3rd runner-up position for the second time. The last time it placed this was in 1969.
 Maryland earns the 4th runner-up position for the first time.
 States that placed in semifinals the previous year were California, District of Columbia, Florida, Louisiana and New York.
 California placed for the seventeenth consecutive year.
 Florida placed for the fifth consecutive year. 
 District of Columbia placed for the fourth consecutive year. 
 Louisiana and New York made their second consecutive placement.
 Arizona, Maryland and Texas last placed in 1971.
 Illinois last placed in 1967.
 Nebraska and Rhode Island last placed in 1961.
 Kansas placed for the first time.
 Michigan breaks an ongoing streak of placements since 1971.

Delegates
The Miss USA 1973 delegates were:

 Alabama - Diane Fouilhe
 Alaska - Wendy Curwen
 Arizona - Sherry Nix
 Arkansas - Christal Phiffer
 California - Carol Herrema
 Colorado - Lenita Mosley
 Connecticut - Wendy Vecchiarino
 Delaware - Linda Sue Graves
 District of Columbia - Nancy Paltcha
 Florida - Stacy Evans
 Georgia - Melanie Chapman
 Hawaii - Camille Deubel
 Idaho - Karen Hammond
 Illinois - Amanda Jones
 Indiana - Debbie Ausenbaugh
 Iowa - Dianne Roberts
 Kansas - Brenda Kopmeyer
 Kentucky - Nancy Coplen
 Louisiana - Storm Hensley
 Maine - Brenda Davis
 Maryland - Betty Jo Grove
 Massachusetts - Judy Gregrory
 Michigan - Linda East
 Minnesota - Cindy James
 Mississippi - Karen Clements
 Missouri - Camilla Crist
 Montana - Jeri Shandorf
 Nebraska - Janice Geiler
 Nevada - Laura Fritz
 New Hampshire - Grace Knox
 New Jersey - Patricia Everett
 New Mexico - Carolyn Cline
 New York - Susan Carlson
 North Carolina - Vivian Craig
 North Dakota - Barbara Lundeen
 Ohio - Jackie Urbanek
 Oklahoma - Martha Buchanan
 Oregon - Judy Bishop
 Pennsylvania - Jill Unbewust
 Rhode Island - Gayle White
 South Carolina - Kiki Kirkland
 South Dakota - Rebecca Bunkers
 Tennessee - Tommye Hooker
 Texas - Lavon McConnell
 Utah - Julia Nebeker
 Vermont - Bonnie Height
 Virginia - Brenda Childress
 Washington - Cindi Arnett
 West Virginia - Kathy Rowand
 Wisconsin - Diane Marie Modrow
 Wyoming - Michele Walter

Judges 
 Arlene Dahl
 Patrick O'Neal
 Dr. Joyce Brothers
 Joe Frazier
 Joy Adams
 Jacklyn Suzanne
 Maria Remenyi

External links 
 Miss USA official website

1973
May 1973 events in the United States
1973 beauty pageants
1973 in New York City